The Red River is a  river in the North Maine Woods region, within Aroostook County, Maine.

The lake is drained by the Fish River, a tributary of the Saint John River.

See also
List of rivers of Maine

References

Maine Streamflow Data from the USGS
Maine Watershed Data From Environmental Protection Agency

Rivers of Aroostook County, Maine
Tributaries of the Saint John River (Bay of Fundy)
North Maine Woods